Katsumi Yamamoto may refer to:
 Katsumi Yamamoto (rowing)
 Katsumi Yamamoto (racing driver)